These lists of cemeteries compile notable cemeteries, mausolea, and other places people are buried worldwide. Reasons for notability include their design, their history, and their interments.

Lists of cemeteries by country

Africa

Algeria

 Thaalibia Cemetery, Casbah of Algiers
 St. Eugene Cemetery, Algiers
 Sidi Garidi Cemetery, Kouba
 Sidi M'hamed Bou Qobrine Cemetery, Belouizdad
 El Kettar Cemetery, Oued Koriche

Egypt
Beni Hasan
City of the Dead (Cairo)
Deir El Bersha
El Bagawat
El Hawawish
Fagg El Gamous
Gabbari necropolis
Halfaya Sollum War Cemetery
Heliopolis War Cemetery
Meir, Egypt
Rifeh
El Sheikh Sa'id
Tell El Kebir
Umm El Qa'ab

Kenya

Morocco
Bab Aghmat cemetery
Bab Ftouh cemetery 
Bab Mahrouk cemetery 
Ben M'Sik European Cemetery 
Chellah – archeological site and necropolis 
Jewish Cemetery of Marrakech 
Jewish Cemetery in Fez 
Marinid Tombs 
Saadian Tombs

Nigeria
 Ibadan Military Cemetery
 Ikoyi Cemetery
 Port Harcourt Cemetery
 Yaba Cemetery
 Mubo Cemetery
 Atan Cemetery
 Hawkins Cemetery

South Africa

 Westpark Cemetery

Americas

Argentina
 La Recoleta Cemetery, Buenos Aires – burial site of Eva Perón, Federico Leloir, and many other Argentine figures
 La Chacarita Cemetery (or "National Cemetery"), Buenos Aires – burial site of Juan Peron (until 2006), Carlos Gardel and many other notables.
 Cementerio del Oeste, Tucumán
 Cementerio San José de Flores, Buenos Aires

Bolivia
 General Cemetery of La Paz
 General Cemetery of Santa Cruz
 La Llamita Cemetery

Brazil
 Cemitério da Consolação, São Paulo – burial site of writer Mário de Andrade, Monteiro Lobato, painter Tarsila do Amaral, former Brazil's president Campos Sales
 Cemitério do Morumbi, São Paulo – burial site of singer Elis Regina, F1 racer Ayrton Senna, actor and comedian Ronald Golias
 Cemitério dos Protestantes, São Paulo
 Cemitério de Vila Formosa, São Paulo – the biggest cemetery in Latin America
 Cemitério São João Batista, Botafogo, Rio de Janeiro. Burial site of Alberto Santos-Dumont, early pioneer of aviation; singer/actress Carmen Miranda, and composer Tom Jobim.

Canada

Colombia
 Central Cemetery of Bogotá – Burial site of several national heroes, poets and former Colombian presidents

Ecuador
 Cementerio General de Guayaquil
 Cementerio de Tulcán
 Cementerio de San Diego (Quito)

Falkland Islands
 Argentine Military Cemetery – military cemetery on East Falkland that holds the remains of 237 Argentine combatants killed during the 1982 Falklands War.
 Blue Beach Military Cemetery at San Carlos – British war cemetery holding the remains of 14 of the 255 British casualties killed during the Falklands War.

Paraguay
 National Pantheon of the Heroes
 Recoleta Cemetery, Asuncion

Peru
 Chauchilla Cemetery – over 1,000 years old
 Presbítero Maestro – cemetery in Lima with significant political and military figures
 Sillustani-Incan Burial Ground

United States

Puerto Rico 
 Cementerio Católico San Vicente de Paul
 Cementerio Municipal de Mayagüez
 Panteón Nacional Román Baldorioty de Castro
 Puerto Rico National Cemetery
 Santa María Magdalena de Pazzis Cemetery

Asia

Bangladesh 
 Christian cemetery, over 200 years old.
 Chittagong Commonwealth War Cemetery
 Maynamati War Cemetery

China

India 
 Agaram cemetery, Bangalore
 Armenian Cemetery, Hyderabad
 Arthat St. Mary's Orthodox Cathedral, Kunnamkulam
 Badakabarastan
 Bahishti Maqbara
 Christian Cemetery, Narayanguda
 Daira Mir Momin
 Delhi War Cemetery
 Jafarganj Cemetery
 Jairampur cemetery
 Kohima War Cemetery
 Khushbagh
 Kirkee War Cemetery
 Lothian Cemetery
 Lower circular road cemetery
 Madras War Cemetery
 Mazar-e-Qasmi
 Mazar-e-Shura
 Nicholson Cemetery, New Delhi
 Portuguese Cemetery, Kollam
 Scottish Cemetery, Calcutta
 Sewri Christian Cemetery
 South Park Street Cemetery
 St. John's Church, Meerut
 York Cemetery, New Delhi

Iran

Iraq 
 Wadi-us-Salaam

Israel

Japan

Malaysia

Pakistan

Saudi Arabia 
 Non–Muslim Cemetery, Jeddah
 Al-Adl cemetery, Mecca
 Al Oud cemetery, Riyadh

South Korea
 Seoul National Cemetery
 United Nations Memorial Cemetery

Taiwan 
 Chin Pao San
 Wuchih Mountain Military Cemetery

Thailand
 Bangkok Protestant Cemetery
 Chungkai War Cemetery
 Kanchanaburi War Cemetery
 Royal Cemetery at Wat Ratchabophit

Uzbekistan

 Shah-i-Zinda(شاه زنده in Persian meaning "The Living King") is one of the world-known necropolises of Central Asia, which is situated in the northeastern part of Samarkand. The Shah-i-Zinda Ensemble includes mausoleums and other ritual buildings of 9–14th and 19th centuries.
 Gur-e-Amir, Samarkand

Vietnam
 Mai Dich Cemetery – cemetery established after French occupation ended in 1954 in Hanoi as a place of worship for heroes of the people. Those buried here include statesmen, writers, poets, and others who have close ties to Vietnam's current government.
 Trường Sơn Cemetery – cemetery established in 1977, after the unification of Vietnam in 1975 as a place of worship for heroes of people. Those buried are soldiers, commanders who sacrificed to build Ho Chi Minh trail during the war against America. It is located in Quảng Trị and has about 72 thousand martyrs.
 Hàng Dương Cemetery – cemetery established 1992 as a place of worship for revolutionary soldiers and heroes who were imprisoned and killed by Republic of Vietnam (South Vietnam) and America.
 Mạc Đĩnh Chi Cemetery – Located in the heart of former Saigon, Mac Dinh Chi was South Vietnam's most prestigious French colonial cemetery reserved for celebrities, politicians and the upper class. Ngo Dinh Diem and his brother Ngo Dinh Nhu were interred here. In the early 1980s, Vietnam's government declared the place a corrupt reminder of the past and dissolved the cemetery by 1983. In accordance to new laws, bodies in Mac Dinh Chi were exhumed, cremated and given to remaining family members whenever possible. A park was built on top of the cemetery.
 Bien Hoa Cemetery – a cemetery for soldiers of Army of Republic of South Vietnam who died during Vietnam War. It is located in Bình Dương Province.

Europe

Azerbaijan 
 Martyrs' Lane
 Alley of Honor

Austria 
 Zentralfriedhof, Vienna

Belgium

 Brussels Cemetery, Brussels
 Laeken Cemetery, Brussels
 Schaerbeek New Cemetery, Schaerbeek, Brussels
 Campo Santo, Gent
 Ixelles Cemetery, Ixelles
 Schoonselhof Cemetery, Antwerp
 Fort de Locin, Liège

Bosnia and Herzegovina 
 Bare Cemetery – Sarajevo

Croatia 
 Mirogoj Cemetery – Zagreb
 Kozala Cemetery – Rijeka

Czech Republic 
 Sedlec Ossuary – Kutná Hora
 Old Jewish Cemetery, Prague
 Ďáblice cemetery, Prague
 Olšany Cemetery, Prague – the biggest graveyard in the Czech Republic
 New Jewish Cemetery, Prague – built next to the Olšany Cemetery to alleviate the space problems faced by the Old Jewish Cemetery, it is the burial place of Franz Kafka
 Vyšehrad cemetery, Prague – the Czech Republic's most important cemetery, it is the burial site for Antonín Dvořák, Alphonse Mucha and Bedřich Smetana, amongst others.

Denmark 
 Assistens Cemetery – here rests f.i. Hans Christian Andersen, Niels Bohr, Hans Christian Ørsted, Søren Kierkegaard, Christoffer Wilhelm Eckersberg, Christen Købke, Ben Webster and Kenny Drew.
 Holmen Cemetery, Copenhagen
 Garrison Cemetery, Copenhagen
 Roskilde Domkirke
 Vestre Cemetery, Copenhagen
 Bispebjerg Cemetery, Copenhagen

Estonia

Finland 

 Great Cemetery of Kuopio, Kuopio
 Hietaniemi Cemetery, Helsinki
 Kalevankangas Cemetery, Tampere
 Kulosaari Cemetery, Helsinki
 Malmi Cemetery, Helsinki
 Oulu Cemetery, Oulu
 Turku Cemetery, Turku

France

Georgia (country)

Germany

Greece 
 First Cemetery of Athens – Cemetery in Central Athens, including the graves of many famous Greek politicians and celebrities like Melina Mercouri, Andreas Papandreou, George Papandreou, George Seferis, Manos Hadjidakis.
 Anastaseos tou Kyriou (Resurrection of Lord) – The biggest public cemetery of Greece. Located east of Thessaloniki.
 Akrotiri, Chania, Crete – Venizelos' tombs. Burial site of the politician Eleftherios Venizelos.
 Vergina, Pella – (Macedonian Tombs). Tomb of the ancient Macedonian King, Philip II of Macedon.
 Tatoi Royal Cemetery – Athens.
 Mikra British Cemetery – Located in the municipality of Kalamaria, in Thessaloniki. The Memorial commemorates 478 nurses, officers and men of the Commonwealth forces who died when troop transports and hospital ships were lost in the Mediterranean, and who have no grave but the sea.
 Skorpios Island, Ionian Sea – Burial site of 20th century's shipping magnate Aristotle Onassis and his daughter Christina Onassis.

Hungary

Ireland

Italy

Latvia

Lithuania

Poland 
 Central Cemetery – cemetery in Szczecin
 Powązki Cemetery – cemetery in Warsaw
 Rakowicki Cemetery – in Kraków
 New Jewish Cemetery, Kraków
 Remuh Cemetery – in Kraków

Portugal 
 Cemitério da Ajuda, Lisbon
 Cemitério do Alto de São João, Lisbon
 Prazeres Cemetery, Lisbon
 Cemitério de Agramonte, Porto
 Cemitério do Prado do Repouso, Porto

Russia

Slovakia 

 National Cemetery, Martin
 Slavín, Bratislava
 Slávičie údolie, Bratislava
 Chatam Sofer Memorial, Bratislava, a burial place of orthodox rabbi Moses Schreiber (1762-1839)

Slovenia

Spain 
 Montjuïc Cemetery, Barcelona
 Poblenou Cemetery, Barcelona
 Cementerio de la Almudena, Madrid
 Cementerio de San Isidro, Madrid, the oldest and most monumental cemetery in Madrid (1811): http://cementeriodesanisidro.com
 Cementerio de San Justo, Madrid, built in 1847
 English Cemetery, Málaga
 Polloe Cemetery, San Sebastian, built 1878
 Cementerio de Lloret de Mar, Gerona, built 1901, example of modernisme.

Sweden 
 Riddarholmen Church, Stockholm
 Uppsala Cathedral is the burial site for several Swedish kings and queens from the 16th and 17th century, as well as Carl Linnaeus and Emanuel Swedenborg. The nearby Old Graveyard houses the grave of Dag Hammarskjöld.
 Östra kyrkogården, Gothenburg lies in east Gothenburg and is the burial site for several famous Swedes, including Karin Boye, Otto Nordenskiöld and Ivar Arosenius.
 Malmö gamla begravningsplats, Malmö
 Norra Begravningsplatsen, established in 1827 in northern Stockholm, is the burial site for a number of Swedish notables including Alfred Nobel, Ingrid Bergman and Ulrich Salchow.
 Skogskyrkogården, a relatively new cemetery opened in 1920 in southern Stockholm, exists as UNESCO World Heritage Site by decision by Swedish authorities. Amongst others, the cemetery contains the graves of actress Greta Garbo.
  in Lund

Switzerland 
 Bremgartenfriedhof, Bern is the burial place of revolutionary anarchist Michail Alexandrowitsch Bakunin
 Cimetière des Rois, Geneva, burial place of Protestant reformer John Calvin
 Cemetery of Celigny, Geneva, burial place of Richard Burton, Vilfredo Pareto and Alistair MacLean
Friedhof am Hörnli, Riehen BS, burial place of Heinrich Altherr, Karl Barth, Ernst Beyeler, Lore Berger, Jacob Burckhardt, Dare (graffiti artist), Fritz Haber, Karin Himboldt, Emanuel Hoffmann, Clara Immerwahr, Karl Jaspers, Charlotte von Kirschbaum, Markus Mattmüller, Paul Hermann Müller, Albert Nicholas, Alfred Rasser, Jean Roux, Maja Sacher, Paul Sacher, Fritz Sarasin, Paul Sarasin, Adrienne von Speyr, Hermann Suter, Hans Martin Sutermeister, Eduard Thurneysen, Mark Tobey, Hans-Peter Tschudi, Rudolf Tschudi, Jacob Wackernagel, Irène Zurkinden
Gottesacker in Riehen BS, burial place of Karl August Auberlen

Turkey

Ukraine
 Lychakiv Cemetery, Lviv
 Baikove Cemetery, Kyiv
 Jewish cemetery of Chernivtsi
 Jewish cemetery of Khotyn

United Kingdom

England

Northern Ireland

Scotland 
 Canongate Kirkyard, Edinburgh, Scotland – Resting place of Adam Smith, regarded as the founder of modern economics
 Greyfriars Kirkyard, Edinburgh – Greyfriars Bobby the Skye terrier
 Glasgow Necropolis, Glasgow, Scotland – elaborate mausolea
 Iona Abbey, last resting place of many kings of Scotland, and Labour leader John Smith

Wales 
 Aberfan Cemetery – Most of the victims of the Aberfan coal tip disaster of 21 October 1966 are buried here
 St Woolos Cemetery, Newport – Opened in 1854, the first municipally-owned cemetery in Wales

Oceania

Australia

New Zealand

Papua New Guinea 
Lae War Cemetery
Port Moresby (Bomana) War Cemetery
Rabaul (Bita Paka) War Cemetery

Philippines

See also

 Taphophilia
 List of mausolea
 List of necropoleis

References

Further reading 
 
 

 
Cemeteries